Petrovo Polje may refer to:

Petrovo Polje, Croatia, a karst field in Dalmatia
Petrovo Polje, Kneževo, a village in Kneževo Municipality, Republika Srpska
Petrovo field, Bosnia and Herzegovina (Bosnian: Petrovo polje), a mountain plateau in Bosnia
Petrovo Polje (Sjenica), a village in Sjenica Municipality, Serbia

See also
 Petrovo (disambiguation)